Vinston Eric Painter (born October 11, 1989) is a former American football offensive tackle. He was drafted by the Denver Broncos in the sixth round of the 2013 NFL Draft out of Virginia Tech.

Professional career

Denver Broncos
Painter was drafted in the sixth round, 173rd overall, by the Denver Broncos in the 2013 NFL Draft. On August 31, 2013, he was released and was signed to the practice squad. He was promoted to the active roster on January 14, 2014.

On August 30, 2014, Painter was released by the Broncos and was signed to the practice squad the next day.

Cleveland Browns
On September 1, 2014, Painter was signed by the Cleveland Browns off the Broncos' practice squad.

On September 5, 2015, he was waived by the Browns.

New York Giants
On September 16, 2015, Painter was signed to the New York Giants' practice squad. On September 30, 2015, he was released by the Giants.

Miami Dolphins
On January 5, 2016, Painter signed with the Dolphins. On August 27, 2016, Painter was waived by the Dolphins.

Washington Redskins
Painter was claimed off waivers by the Washington Redskins on August 29, 2016. He was released by the team on September 3, 2016. The next day, the team signed him to their practice squad. On September 27, 2016, he was promoted to the active roster.

On February 28, 2017, Painter was tendered by the Redskins. He officially re-signed with the team on March 15. He was waived on September 2, 2017.

Arizona Cardinals
On September 14, 2017, Painter was signed to the Arizona Cardinals' practice squad. He was promoted to the active roster on September 30, 2017, but was waived three days later and re-signed back to the practice squad. He was promoted back to the active roster on November 16, 2017. He was waived on November 28, 2017 and was re-signed to the practice squad. On December 11, 2017, he was promoted to the active roster after Jared Veldheer suffered a season-ending ankle injury that resulted him being placed on injured reserve.

On September 1, 2018, Painter was released by the Cardinals.

Hamilton Tiger-Cats
Painter signed with the Hamilton Tiger-Cats of the Canadian Football League on March 20, 2019. He retired from professional football on May 15, 2019.

References

External links
Washington Redskins bio
Virginia Tech Hokies bio

1989 births
Living people
Players of American football from Norfolk, Virginia
Players of Canadian football from Norfolk, Virginia
American football offensive tackles
American football offensive guards
Virginia Tech Hokies football players
Denver Broncos players
Cleveland Browns players
New York Giants players
Miami Dolphins players
Washington Redskins players
Arizona Cardinals players
Hamilton Tiger-Cats players